Judy Moorcroft (21 September 1933 – 13 December 1991) was a British costume designer who had two Academy Award nominations as well as three BAFTA nominations.

Awards nominations

Moorcroft received two nominations for the Academy Award for Best Costume Design:

52nd Academy Awards-Nominated for The Europeans. Lost to All That Jazz.
57th Academy Awards-Nominated for A Passage to India. Lost to Amadeus.

She also received nominations for the BAFTA Award for Best Costume Design for those films as well as one for The Dressmaker.

References

External links

British costume designers
Women costume designers
1933 births
1991 deaths
Place of birth missing
Place of death missing